The Precursors is a video game from Ukrainian developer Deep Shadows. It was released on the 4 December 2009 as retail for the PC in Russia. The game is set in a futuristic sci-fi environment where many political factions are engaged in an intergalactic war. The player is able to explore a multitude of planets, travel through outer space to complete missions, obtain information, and buy weapons and supplies in a free-roaming environment. "The game blends role-playing engagement and dynamic FPS-style action in a completely open world".

Gameplay 
The game features a free-roaming world, with vast open areas, diverse weapons and a multitude of land, air and space vehicles. The player will be able to do a multitude of missions on six different planets or moons and even the interior of spaceships and space stations. Different vehicles can be used in engagements on the ground ranging from simple buggies and flyers to hover tanks and mechanical robots. After getting a spaceship, the player can also engage in space trade and combat with other factions in between the planetary missions. The player's spaceship can be upgraded throughout the game and the player character himself can be developed using a perk system.

Factions 
There are seven main factions in the game. Two being aliens and the rest representing various humanoid factions which are split into separate alliances that are usually fighting each other. These factions are the Empire, the Democratic Union, the Free Traders, the Clatz of the Nest, the revolutionary Clatz, the bandits and the civilians.

History
The Precursors has been in development for PC and Xbox 360 from Kyiv-based developer Deep Shadows; the Xbox 360 version was later cancelled. The game was built based on Deep Shadows in-house game engine Vital Engine 3 which also powers White Gold: War in Paradise. The game was first demonstrated in August 2005 at the Games Convention in Leipzig, Germany and at the Electronic Entertainment Expo in Los Angeles in May 2006.

The Precursors was released on the 4 December 2009 as retail for the PC in Russia. In May 2010, a spokesperson from Deep Shadows confirmed that the console version of the game has been put "on hold" indefinitely.  In December 2010, an English version was made available via digital distribution by GamersGate. and online retailer Beamdog. On February 4, 2017 a Steam re-release followed.

After the end of official support by Deep Shadows, remaining bugs and issues, like the missing voice overs in the localized English version, were fixed by the game community via unofficial patches which also form the base of and are included in the current English digital distribution versions of the game.

Reception
The game holds a mixed score on Metacritic based on four reviews.

References

External links 
 Deep Shadows' official website (English language section)

See also 
 Parkan (videogame)
 White Gold: War in Paradise

2009 video games
First-person shooters
Role-playing video games
Science fiction video games
Space trading and combat simulators
Video games developed in Ukraine
Video games set on fictional planets
Windows games
Windows-only games
Open-world video games
Russobit-M games
Single-player video games